Gasper is both a given name and surname. Notable people with the name include:

 Chase Gasper (born 1996), American soccer player
 Gasper Urban (1923–1998), American football player
 George Gasper (born 1939), American mathematician

See also
 Glasper